The 79th District of the Iowa House of Representatives in the state of Iowa.

Current elected officials
Tracy Ehlert is the representative currently representing the district.

Past representatives
The district has previously been represented by:
 George J. Knoke, 1971–1973
 LaVern R. Harvey, 1973–1979
 James A. Lorenzen, 1979–1981
 Joan Smith, 1981–1983
 John Connors, 1983–1993
 Michael J. O'Brien, 1993–2003
 Dan Boddicker, 2003–2005
 Jeff Kaufmann, 2005–2013
 Guy Vander Linden, 2013–2019
 Dustin Hite, 2019–2023
 Tracy Ehlert, 2023–present

References

079